André-Frank Zambo Anguissa (born 16 November 1995) is a Cameroonian professional footballer who plays as a midfielder for  club Napoli and the Cameroon national team.

Club career
Zambo Anguissa joined Marseille in 2015 from Stade de Reims. He made his first team debut on 17 September 2015 in the UEFA Europa League against FC Groningen. Three days later, he made his Ligue 1 debut against Lyon.

On 16 May 2018, he played in the 2018 UEFA Europa League Final which Marseille lost against Atlético Madrid at the Parc Olympique Lyonnais in Décines-Charpieu, Lyon, France.

Fulham
In August 2018, he was transferred to Fulham from Marseille and was loaned to Villarreal in July 2019 following Fulham's relegation from the Premier League. He made his Villarreal debut on 17 August, playing full 90 minutes in a 4–4 home draw against Granada CF.

On 31 August 2021, Anguissa signed a new three-year contract with the Championship club before heading out on loan to Napoli for the 2021–22 season.

Napoli
On 26 May 2022, Napoli purchased Anguissa's rights from Fulham. On 7 September, he scored his first Champions League goal in a 4–1 win over Liverpool. On 1 October, he scored his first Serie A goals, by netting a brace in a 3–1 win over Torino.

International career
Zambo Anguissa made his international debut for the Cameroon national team in a friendly 1–0 win over Tunisia on 24 March 2017.

Career statistics

Club

International

Scores and results list Cameroon's goal tally first.

Honours
Marseille
UEFA Europa League runner-up: 2017–18

Cameroon

 Africa Cup of Nations bronze: 2021

References

External links
Profile at the S.S.C. Napoli website

1995 births
Living people
Footballers from Yaoundé
Cameroonian footballers
Cameroon international footballers
Association football midfielders
Olympique de Marseille players
Fulham F.C. players
Villarreal CF players
S.S.C. Napoli players
Ligue 1 players
Premier League players
English Football League players
La Liga players
Serie A players
2017 FIFA Confederations Cup players
2019 Africa Cup of Nations players
2021 Africa Cup of Nations players
2022 FIFA World Cup players
Cameroonian expatriate footballers
Expatriate footballers in France
Expatriate footballers in England
Expatriate footballers in Spain
Expatriate footballers in Italy
Cameroonian expatriate sportspeople in France
Cameroonian expatriate sportspeople in England
Cameroonian expatriate sportspeople in Spain
Cameroonian expatriate sportspeople in Italy